Suzak or Sozak may refer to:
Places
 Suzak District, in Jalal-Abad Province, Kyrgyzstan.
 Suzak, a village in that district
 Sozak District, in South Kazakhstan Province, Kazakhstan
 Sozak, a village in that district
 Suzak, a village in Andijan Region, Uzbekistan.
Companies
 Suzak Inc., a video game developer

See also
 Susac (disambiguation)